Viorica Cucereanu-Bogatu (born 1957) is a journalist from the Republic of Moldova. She is the Secretary of the Supervisory Board of PNAC TeleRadio-Moldova since 2009.

Biography 
Viorica Cucereanu graduated from Moldova State University in 1979 and worked for TeleRadio-Moldova (August 1979 - November 2004). She was active during the 2002 strike at TeleRadio-Moldova. Her dismissal in 2004 was illegal, according to the European Court of Human Rights.

She works for Euro TV Moldova (November 2005 - February 2007), TV Euronova (April – October 2005), Moldova Urbană (May – December 2005, April – December 2006). Viorica Cucereanu contributed to Timpul de dimineaţă, Jurnal de Chişinău, Ziarul de Gardă, Flux, VIP-Magazin, Zece Plus. Since June 2007, she has been editor in chief of "Akademos", a magazine of the Academy of Sciences of Moldova.

Awards 
 1992 - Best TV presenter (TeleRadio-Moldova)
 1998 - first prize, the annual Ziaristelor Club "Ten Plus"
 1993, 2001, 2002, 2003, 2007 Academy of Sciences of Moldova Award "Archimedean lever"
 2001 - National Prize in journalism for 2000
 2002 - first prize in the contest "10 years of United Nations in Moldova"
 2005 - Winner of Contest for the best reflection of the gender theme in the press, organized by the Gender Centre of Moldova
 2006 - second prize for the film parallel world of the deaf, VI International Festival of Documentary Film "Chronograph", Chisinau

Works 
 Femeia în labirintul istoriei (2003),
 Democraţia la feminin (2005),
 Femeia în zonele de conflict (2006),
 Ispita neuitării (about Prometeu-Prim Lyceum) (2006)

Films 
 16 zile de combatere a violenţei împotriva femeii, 2001
 Oraşul Bălţi, parametrii asistenţei sociale, (1999).
 filme instructive pentru fermieri la solicitarea ONG “Bios” (2000).
 Femeia, măsură a democraţiei, (2002).

References

Bibliography 
 Enciclopedia Femeile Moldovei, editura Muzeum, 2000

External links 
 (AUDIO)Corina Fusu: La Televiziunea publică continuă o cenzură hidoasă, o propagandă brutală, sălbatică şi agresivă
 Public company “Teleradio Moldova” is ruled by relatives

1957 births
Living people
Moldovan journalists
Moldovan women journalists
Moldovan writers
Moldovan women writers
Teleradio-Moldova